The Fukuryu Stakes (in Japanese: 伏竜ステークス), is a race for three-year-old colts and fillies.

Race details

The race was first held in 2000. It is usually held at the end of March or the first week of April. There was no race held in 2011.

The race is a qualifier for the Kentucky Derby and is part of the Road to the Kentucky Derby.

It has always been held at Nakayama Racecourse.

Winners since 2015

Past winners

Past winners include:

See also
 Horse racing in Japan
 List of Japanese flat horse races

References

Horse races in Japan
Recurring sporting events established in 2000